Best of Sweetbox 1995-2005 (also titled The Greatest Hits) is a compilation album of Sweetbox with Jade Villalon as frontwoman. It was released in 2005 in three different editions. It contains the previously unreleased tracks Crown of Thorns and Don't Wanna Kill You, along with several remixes, demo versions, new versions of songs and Jade's brand-new, changed-lyric version of Everything's Gonna Be Alright, which was a song made famous by Sweetbox' previous vocalist Tina Harris.

Track listing

The Greatest Hits

 Everything's Gonna Be Alright -Reborn-
 Life Is Cool
 For The Lonely (Even Sweeter Version)
 Waterfall
 After The Lights
 Killing Me DJ
 Hate Without Frontiers
 Read My Mind
 Don't Wanna Kill You
 Piano In The Dark
 Every Time (All Grown Up Version)
 Crown of Thorns
 Utopia
 Lighter Shade Of Blue (European Version)
 On The Radio
 Somewhere
 Chyna Girl
 Cinderella (Electric Spice Mix)
 Everything's Gonna Be Alright (Classic Mix)
 Unforgiven (Unreleased Demo Version)

Best of Sweetbox 1995–2005 (European version)
 Everything's Gonna Be Alright -Reborn-
 Life Is Cool
 For The Lonely
 Waterfall
 After The Lights
 Killing Me DJ (European Version)
 Hate Without Frontiers
 Every Time (New Version)
 Piano In The Dark
 On The Radio
 Lighter Shade Of Blue (European Version)
 God On Video
 More Than Love
 Chyna Girl
 Crazy (Unreleased Demo Version)
 Tour De France (Unreleased Demo Version)
 Cinderella (Electric Spice Mix)
 Don't Push Me
 Booyah - Here We Go (Bonus Track)
 Shakalaka (Bonus Track)

Best of Sweetbox 1995–2005 (Korean version, 2 CD)

 Everything's Gonna Be Alright -Reborn-
 Life Is Cool
 For The Lonely (Even Sweeter Version)
 Every Time (New Version)
 Read My Mind
 Cinderella (Electric Spice Mix)
 Lighter Shade Of Blue (European Version)
 On The Radio
 Chyna Girl
 Liberty
 Human Sacrifice
 Unforgiven
 Sorry
 Don't Push Me
 I'll Be There
 Crazy (Unreleased Demo Version)
Disc 2
 Everything's Gonna Be Alright (Classic Mix)
 Alright (Unplugged)
 Unforgiven (Unplugged)
 Utopia (Unplugged)
 Read My Mind (Acoustic Version)
 Unforgiven (Unreleased Demo Version)
 Booyah - Here We Go
 Shakalaka

Best of Sweetbox 1995–2005 (Taiwanese Version)
 Everything's Gonna Be Alright -Reborn-
 Read My Mind
 That Night
 For The Lonely (Even Sweeter Version)
 More Than Love
 Life Is Cool
 Every Time (New Version)
 Chyna Girl
 Superstar
 Killing Me DJ
 Somewhere
 Cinderella (Electric Spice Mix)
 Unforgiven (Geo's Mix)
 After The Lights
 On The Radio
 Hate Without Frontiers
 Here On My Own (Lighter Shade Of Blue) (European Version)
 Piano In The Dark
 Crazy
 Tour De France

Singles
 Everything's Gonna Be Alright -Reborn- [Promo]

Chart performance
 The Greatest Hits reached #1 on Oricon's International Charts in Japan and held the position for three consecutive weeks in February 2005.
 Best Of reached #1 in Korea in May 2005 (won Double Platinum).
 The Greatest Hits sold 205,507 copies and became the 73rd best selling album of 2005.

Certifications

References

Sweetbox compilation albums
2005 greatest hits albums